John Lincoln Felton (December 24, 1883 – February 7, 1961) was an American football coach. He served two stints as the head football coach at West Virginia Wesleyan College in Buckhannon, West Virginia from 1912 to 1913 and in 1921. Felton was also the head football coach at McDaniel College (then known as Western Maryland College) in 1914 and at Muskingum College in Ohio in 1916. He was a graduate of Dickinson College in Carlisle, Pennsylvania.

References

External links
 

1883 births
1961 deaths
McDaniel Green Terror football coaches
Muskingum Fighting Muskies football coaches
West Virginia Wesleyan Bobcats football coaches
Dickinson College alumni
People from Bedford County, Pennsylvania
Sportspeople from Pennsylvania